Kirsten Elizabeth Keswick 'Kirsty' Hughes (11 November 1962 – 27 May 2022) was a British actress best known for playing cartoon strip heroine Jane in the 1987 film Jane and the Lost City.

Hughes was the daughter of a BP businessman and was raised in Fleet in Hampshire before training at the Royal Academy of Dramatic Art. She first came to notice when she appeared as an air stewardess in an ad for British Airways in 1986. She played Elizabeth Robertson in an episode of the schools' series Starting Out alongside Joanna Lumley and Rebecca Lacey (1986). In 1987 she played cartoon strip heroine Jane in the film Jane and the Lost City. Hughes played  Mary McKinnon in The Kitchen Toto (1987), Anna in At the Cafe Continental (1989), Trudy/Kate Hindley in Boon  (1987-1991), Allison Mannering in the Channel 5 children's television series The Enid Blyton Adventures (1997), and Cynthia Barton in Reversals (2003).

From 1995 to 2011 she was the partner of Sir Benjamin Slade, and worked with him in making Maunsel House and neighbouring Woodlands Castle into a successful wedding venue. After a three-year affair, she later "ran off with the handyman".

After breaking up with her new partner after a year, Hughes worked firstly as Operations Manager and later Business Manager at Dillington House, Somerset.

References

External links
 
'Actress dumps aristocrat lover who made her wealthy.. for his gardener' - Daily Record  11 April 2012
'Sir Ben freezes the family assets' -  Daily Express 17 February 2013

1962 births
English television actresses
English film actresses
Alumni of RADA
2022 deaths